Domenick Jack Irrera (born November 18, 1948) is an American actor and stand-up comedian. Much of his material is in the form of stories about his life, especially his childhood years and growing up in an Italian-American family.

Irrera went to college in Florida, attending Barry University and St. Thomas University.

Irrera has appeared on The Oprah Winfrey Show, The View, The Tonight Show Starring Johnny Carson in 1986, The Tonight Show with Jay Leno, The Late Late Show with Craig Ferguson, and The Late Show with David Letterman.

Irrera is a regular performer at the Cat Laughs in Kilkenny; he has made 22 appearances at the festival, more than any other comic. He appeared on an episode of the NBC sitcom Seinfeld as Ronnie Kaye, the prop comic and on the CBS sitcom The King of Queens as Spero Demopolous. Irrera made 11 appearances as himself on the animated series Dr. Katz, Professional Therapist, and is the only comic to appear in all six seasons.

Irrera was voted one of the hundred funniest comics of all time by Comedy Central. He was the Judge on the Supreme Court of Comedy on the 101 exclusively on DirecTV.

He also did some voiceovers for Nickelodeon as Ernie Potts on Hey Arnold! and as Duke on Back at the Barnyard, and played a chauffeur in the 1998 film The Big Lebowski.

Discography
Greatest Hits Volume One (2003)

Filmography

Film

Television

References

External links
Dom Irrera's Official Website

American male voice actors
American stand-up comedians
American people of Italian descent
Living people
1948 births
Male actors from Philadelphia
St. Thomas University (Florida) alumni
20th-century American comedians
21st-century American comedians